The Third Reich Trilogy is a series of three narrative history books by British historian Richard J. Evans, covering the rise and collapse of Nazi Germany in detail, with a focus on the internal politics and the decision-making process. The three volumes of the trilogy – The Coming of the Third Reich, The Third Reich In Power, and The Third Reich at War – were published between 2003 and 2008. The books are illustrated with maps created by András Bereznay.

According to Ian Kershaw, it is "the most comprehensive history in any language of the disastrous epoch of the Third Reich". It has been hailed as a "masterpiece of historical scholarship."

Books

The Coming of the Third Reich 
The first volume, The Coming of the Third Reich, was published by Penguin in the UK in October 2003 (622 pages), and in the US in February 2004 (656 pages). It describes the origins of the Nazi Party and the circumstances that led to its gaining control of the Weimar Republic, covering the period from the unification of Germany in 1871 through the First World War and the interwar period to 1933, when Adolf Hitler and the Nazis seized power in Germany.

The Third Reich in Power 
The second volume, The Third Reich in Power, was published by Penguin in the UK and the US in October 2005 (UK: , 960 pages; US: , 960 pages). It describes how Hitler transformed Germany into a totalitarian dictatorship during the 1930s, picking up where the first volume left off, and ending with the start of World War II in September 1939.

The Third Reich at War 
The third volume, The Third Reich at War, was published by Penguin in the UK in October 2008 (912 pages), and in the US in March 2009 (944 pages). It describes the entire wartime period of Nazi Germany, beginning with the invasion of Poland in 1939 and completing the timeline with the end of the war and the defeat and surrender of Nazi Germany in 1945.

Limited-edition boxed set 
To coincide with the release of the final volume of the trilogy, Allen Lane published a limited edition boxed set containing special editions of the three books, using heavier paper and better binding than the regular trade editions. This set is now out of print.

Similar or related works
 The Origins of the Second World War by  A.J.P. Taylor (1961).
 The Twenty Years' Crisis by E. H. Carr (1939).
 The Lights that Failed: European International History 1919-1933 by Zara Steiner (2007).
 The Triumph of the Dark: European International History 1933-1939 by Zara Steiner (2011).

References 

2003 non-fiction books
2005 non-fiction books
2008 non-fiction books
History books about Nazi Germany
Series of history books about World War II